The 1950 Oklahoma Sooners football team represented the University of Oklahoma in the 1950 college football season, the 56th season of Sooner football. Led by fourth-year head coach Bud Wilkinson, they played their home games at Oklahoma Memorial Stadium in Norman, and competed in the Big Seven Conference.

The Sooners finished the regular season 10–0 (6–0 in Big 7), and won their fifth consecutive conference championship, and eleventh overall. Both major polls (AP writers, UP coaches) awarded the Sooners with their first national championship at the end of the regular season. They were invited to the Sugar Bowl in New Orleans on  but were upset  by the Kentucky Wildcats, halting their winning streak at 

Five Sooners received All-American honors following the season: Frankie Anderson, Buddy Jones, Leon Heath, and Jim Weatherall. In addition, eight sooners won all conference honors, Anderson, Claude Arnold, Tom Catlin, Heath, Norman McNabb, Harry Moore, Billy Vessels, and Weatherall.

Schedule

Roster
 QB Eddie Crowder, So.
 QB Claude Arnold, Sr.
 HB Billy Vessels, So.
 T Jim Weatherall

Rankings

Game summaries

Texas (Red River Shootout)
Late in the contest, a low punt snap gives Oklahoma the ball at the Texas 11. Billy Vessels dashes around right end for the touchdown while Texas native Jim Weatherall kicks the game-winning extra point for the 14–13 victory. Minutes earlier, Longhorns defensive back Bobby Dillon had returned at interception 50 yards for a touchdown and a 13-7 Texas lead. Twice during the contest Texas had goal-line scoring opportunities, once stopped by Oklahoma's defense at the one-yard line and another ended with a fumble at the five.

NFL Draft
The following players were drafted into the National Football League following the season.

References

Oklahoma
Oklahoma Sooners football seasons
College football national champions
Big Eight Conference football champion seasons
Oklahoma Sooners football